Beris strobli is a European species of soldier fly.

Distribtion
Austria, Czech Republic, Germany, Hungary, Switzerland.

References

Stratiomyidae
Diptera of Europe
Insects described in 1968